Hydrocortisone/oxytetracycline (trade name Terra-Cortril) is a combination drug, consisting of the anti-inflammatory drug hydrocortisone and the antibiotic drug oxytetracycline.

It is indicated, for example, in steroid-responsive inflammatory ocular conditions where bacterial infection or a risk of bacterial ocular infection exists.

References

Combination drugs